Blackskull is a small village in County Down, Northern Ireland. It lies near Donaghcloney and Dromore. In the 2001 Census it had a population of 168 people. It is within the Craigavon Borough Council area.

The village is named after an old inn called the Black Skull, which had a picture of a black man's head on its sign. A grisly local tale tells how a black man was beheaded and his skull mounted above the door of the Inn. Formerly, the area was known as Ballygunaghan, after the townland in which it lies.

See also 
List of towns and villages in Northern Ireland

References 

Villages in County Down